Cedar Township is a township in Chase County, Kansas, United States.  As of the 2000 census, its population was 116.

Geography
The streams of Bills Creek, Brush Creek, Middle Creek and Turkey Creek run through this township.

Communities
The township contains the following settlements:
 Unincorporated community of Wonsevu.

Cemeteries
The township contains the following cemeteries:
 Griffith.
 Wonsevu.

Transportation
Cedar Township contains one airport or landing strip, Clothier Landing Field.

Further reading

References

External links
 Chase County Website
 City-Data.com
 Chase County Maps: Current, Historic, KDOT

Townships in Chase County, Kansas
Townships in Kansas